The following is a list of coaches to have coached the Brisbane Bears, a now-defunct Australian rules football club which played in the VFL (from 1987–1989) and the AFL (1990–1996).

(sortableproblem)

Key: 
 P = Played
 W = Won
 L = Lost
 D = Drew
 W% = Win percentage

Australian rules football records and statistics

Brisbane Bears coaches
Brisbane Bears

See also
List of Fitzroy Football Club coaches

List of Brisbane Lions coaches